The 2005 Speedway World Cup Event 1 was the first race of the 2005 Speedway World Cup season. It took place on July 31, 2005 in the Abbey Stadium in Swindon, Great Britain.

Results

Heat details

Heat after heat 
 N. PEDERSEN, Darkin, Rymel, Screen
 STEAD, B. Pedersen, Kurguskin, A. Dryml(e)
 RICHARDSON, Vlassov, L. Dryml, Andersen(f)
 NICHOLLS, Iversen, Topinka, Gizatulin
 GJEDDE, Harris, Gafurov, Suchanek
 RICHARDSON, Topinka, Darkin(x), Gjedde(x)
 N. PEDERSEN, Nicholls, Suchanek, Kurguskin
 HARRIS, B. Pedersen, Rymel, Vlassov
 SCREEN, A. Dryml, Andersen, Gizatulin
 IVERSEN, Stead, Stad. Dryml, Gafurow(u)
 B. PEDERSEN, Nicholls, Darkin, L. Dryml
 ANDERSEN, Harris, Topinka, Kurguskin
 SCREEN, Iversen, Suchanek, Wlasow(w)
 STEAD, Gjedde, Gizatulin, Rymel
 RICHARDSON, N. Pedersen, Gafurov, A. Dryml
 ANDERSEN(J), Stead, Suchanek, Darkin
 RICHARDSON, Iversen, Kurguskin, Rymel(e)
 NICHOLLS, A. Dryml, Gafurov, Gjedde
 N. PEDERSEN, Harris, Gizatulin, L. Dryml
 B. PEDERSEN, Gafurov, Screen, Topinka
 HARRIS, A. Dryml, Iversen, Darkin
 A. DRYML(J), Gjedde, Screen, Gizatulin
 TOPINKA, Stead, N. Pedersen, Kurguskin
 RICHARDSON, B. Pedersen, Darkin(J), L. Dryml
 ANDERSEN, Nicholls, Gafurov, Rymel

References

See also 
 2005 Speedway World Cup
 motorcycle speedway

E1